The L V Prasad Eye Institute (LVPEI) is an eye-care network, established by Dr. Gullapalli Nageswara Rao, an ophthalmologist, at Hyderabad, in 1987. It is a non-profit, multi-campus, non-governmental institution. With more than 275 eye-care centres in India, it is the largest eye-care network in the world. 

LVPEI is a World Health Organization (WHO) collaborating centre, and an affiliate hospital of Harvard Medical School. It is the first eye hospital to be accredited by the National Accreditation Board for Hospitals & Healthcare Providers (NABH).

Establishment 

Established in 1987, L V Prasad Eye Institute (LVPEI), a World Health Organization Collaborating Centre for Prevention of Blindness, is a comprehensive eye health facility. The institute has ten active arms to its areas of operations: Clinical Services, Education, Research, Vision Rehabilitation, Rural and Community Eye Health, Eye Banking, Advocacy and Policy Planning, Capacity Building, Innovation and Product Development. LVPEI is managed by two not-for-profit entities – Hyderabad Eye Institute (HEI) and Hyderabad Eye Research Foundation (HERF).

The beginning, before the brick and mortar of the institute, the renowned Indian film-maker Sri Akkineni Lakshmi Vara Prasad Rao, popularly known as L V Prasad, decided to invest a part of the profits of his blockbuster film Ek Duuje Ke Liye for a worthy cause. He donated rupees one crore and five acres of land for establishing the state-of-the-art Eye Institute. In recognition of this gesture, the board of the institute decided to name the institute after him. Over the years, his family has continued to support the institute's work. His son, Mr Ramesh Prasad, managing director of Prasad Film Laboratories, is a founder trustee of LVPEI and is the longest serving member of the Hyderabad Eye Institute's governing board, along with Dr Rao. It has maintained its tradition of naming its centres and facilities after its benefactors. Among its notable benefactors and donors are several corporate such as Infosys, Microsoft, State Bank of India, Standard Chartered, ICICI, Aditya Birla Group, Dalmia Group, Bajaj Group, Sun Pharma, Natco Pharma, NALCO.

Active areas of operation

Clinical Services 
LVPEI has served nearly 34.14 million (3.4 crore) people, with over 50% of them entirely free of cost, irrespective of the complexity of care needed, done over 1.93 million surgeries, trained over 55,000 ophthalmologists and optometrists. The institute offers rehabilitation services for persons with visually impairment, and in 2018 it inaugurated a 'Special Needs Vision Clinic' to provide eye care to children with developmental delays and disabilities.

Education and Research
Scientists from L V Prasad Eye Institute are listed amongst the world's top 2% by Stanford University. It is an affiliate hospital of Harvard Medical School.It has academic and research linkages with Massachusetts Institute of Technology, BITS Pilani,  IIM Ahmedabad, IIT Hyderabad, University of Hyderabad, GITAM, University of Sheffield, University of Bradford.

Centers

LVPEI network has 275 eye-care centres across the states of Karnataka, Odisha, Telangana and Andhra Pradesh:
 Main center in Banjara Hills, named after Kallam Anji Reddy the founder of Dr.Reddy Labs.
 3 tertiary centers in Visakhapatnam, Bhubaneswar and Vijayawada.
 26 secondary centers
 245 primary care centers
The secondary and primary care centers provide medical facilities to the remotest rural areas of the country.

Eye bank
As of 2020, LVPEI Eye Bank Network has been performing over 2,000 corneal transplant surgeries every year. As of February 2023, total corneas collected were 1,19,279 and over 69,964 corneal transplant surgeries have been performed at the institute, which may be the highest at a single institute anywhere in the world.

The RIEB set up the Hyderabad Cornea Preservation Medium Centre which uses a McKarey Kauffman (MK) Medium.

Awards
 Greenberg Prize – End Blindness 2020
Sarojini Triloknath National Award 2020

See also
Genome Valley

References 

Ophthalmology organizations
Healthcare in Hyderabad, India
Hospitals in Hyderabad, India
Hospitals in Visakhapatnam
Eye care in India
Hospitals established in 1987
1987 establishments in Andhra Pradesh